In Roman law, a novel ("new decree") is a new decree or edict, in other words a new law. The term was used from the fourth century AD onwards and was specifically used for laws issued after the publishing of the Codex Theodosianus in 438 and then for the Justiniac Novels, or Novellae Constitutiones. The term was used on and off in later Roman history until falling out of use during the late Byzantine period.

See also
 Constitution (Roman law)
 International Roman Law Moot Court
 List of Roman laws

References

Further reading
H. F. Jolowicz and B. Nicholas, Historical Introduction to Roman Law, 3rd edn. (1972)

Roman law
Byzantine law